The 2022 Keystone Giants football team represented Keystone College as a member of the Eastern Collegiate Football Conference (ECFC) during the 2022 NCAA Division III football season. The Giants, led by 4th-year head coach Justin Higgins, played their home games at Turf Field Complex in La Plume, Pennsylvania.

Previous season

The Giants finished the 2021 season with a record of 0–10 (0–6 in the ECFC). They finished in last place.

Schedule

Game summaries

Wilkes

Personnel

Coaching staff

Roster

References

Keystone
Keystone Giants football seasons
Keystone Giants football